Emre Ünver (born 19 November 1981) is a Dutch politician. He was a member of the House of Representatives for the Labour Party from 14 December 2016 until 15 February 2017, replacing Sjoera Dikkers. Ünver was a member of the municipal council of Amsterdam from 11 March 2006 until 2018 and served as party vice-councilchairman. Since May 2018 he has been President of the board of the borough of Amsterdam Nieuw-West.

In June 2016 Ünver spoke out against Turkey under Recep Tayyip Erdoğan, questioning how Labour Party members could defend his policies.

References

External links
 

1981 births
Living people
21st-century Dutch politicians
Labour Party (Netherlands) politicians
Members of the House of Representatives (Netherlands)
Municipal councillors of Amsterdam